The following is a list of events affecting Philippine television in 2007. Events listed include television show debuts, finales, cancellations, and channel launches, closures and rebrandings, as well as information about controversies and carriage disputes.

Events

May
 May 14–15 – All Philippine TV networks had its special coverage of the 2007 mid-term elections.

June
 June 30: Beatriz Saw wins the second season of Pinoy Big Brother.

July
 July 24: Smart Communications and 360media launched a commercial mobile TV service to binge-watch television channels and programs through phone devices, myTV.

December
 December 6–15: NBN 4, ABC 5 and IBC 13 airs the 2007 Southeast Asian Games "A Time for Heroes" coverage.

Premieres

Unknown dates
March:
 Living It Up on Q 11
 Entertainment Tonight on 2nd Avenue
 The Insider on 2nd Avenue
April: Camera Café on GMA 7
August: Rush TV on Studio 23
September: Gossip Girl on ETC
October: Mga Waging Kuwento ng OFW on Q 11
November: House of Hoops on ABC 5
December: Friends Again on NBN 4

Unknown
The Search for the Next White Castle Girl on ABS-CBN 2
Sirit on ABS-CBN 2
Just Joking on GMA 7
Move: The Search for Billy Crawford's Pinoy Dancers on GMA 7
Moments on Net 25
Starting Over on 2nd Avenue
The Daily 10 on ETC
Top Chef on 2nd Avenue
Sports 37 on UNTV 37
Bread Tambayan on UNTV 37
Bihasa: Bibliya Hamon Sa'yo on UNTV 37
Minuto on NBN 4
Krusada Kontra Korupsyon on NBN 4/RPN 9/IBC 13
Ratsada E on IBC 13
Mommy Academy on IBC 13
Ating Alamin on IBC 13
Buhay Pinoy on ABC 5

Returning or renamed programs

Programs transferring networks

Finales
January 5: A Rosy Life (GMA 7)
January 12: Captain Barbell (GMA 7)
January 28: Ang Mahiwagang Baul (GMA 7)
February 3: Little Big Star (ABS-CBN 2)
February 7: Now Na! (QTV 11)
February 9:
 Cardcaptor Sakura (GMA 7)
 Super Inggo (ABS-CBN 2)
 Atlantika (GMA 7)
February 10: Showbiz Stripped (GMA 7)
February 16:
 Makita Ka Lang Muli (GMA 7)
 Ghost Fighter (GMA 7)
February 23: Kapamilya, Deal or No Deal (season 1) (ABS-CBN 2)
February 25: It Started with a Kiss (ABS-CBN 2)
February 26: For M (RPN 9)
March 9: 
 Jewel in the Palace by Popular Demand (GMA 7)
 RPN NewsWatch Now (RPN 9)
March 10
 Kasangga Mo ang Langit (RPN 9)
 Biyaheng Langit (RPN 9)
March 15: O, Mare Ko (QTV 11)
March 16:
Ganda ng Lola Ko (QTV 11)
Sad Love Song (QTV 11)
March 18: Flash Report sa QTV (Q 11)
March 25: StarStruck: The Next Level (GMA 7)
April 4:
 The Morning Show (NBN 4)
 TV Patrol Bacolod (ABS-CBN TV-4 Bacolod)
 Yellow Handkerchief (GMA 7)
 Bakekang (GMA 7)
April 8: Flash Report sa Q (Q 11)
April 9: Lagot Ka, Isusumbong Kita (GMA 7)
April 12: Princess Hours (ABS-CBN 2)
April 20:
 Sana Maulit Muli (ABS-CBN 2)
 Palimos ng Pag-ibig (ABS-CBN 2)
 Full House (GMA 7)
 One Piece (GMA 7)
 Gokusen 2 (GMA 7)
April 22: S-Files (GMA 7)
April 27:
 Princess Charming (GMA 7)
April 28: Da Adventures of Pedro Penduko (ABS-CBN 2)
May 4:
 One Million Roses (GMA 7)
 Mirada de mujer (ABS-CBN 2)
 My Strange Family (GMA 7)
May 5: Aalog-Alog (ABS-CBN 2)
May 12: Little Big Superstar (ABS-CBN 2)
May 13: Philippine Agenda (GMA 7)
May 18: Muli (GMA 7)
May 19: 
 Teka Mona (ABC 5)
 Let's Go! (ABS-CBN 2)
May 25:
 Hana Yori Dango (GMA 7)
 Maging Sino Ka Man (ABS-CBN 2)
June 1: 
 Hiram na Mukha (ABS-CBN 2)
 Super Twins (GMA 7)
 Showbiz Ka! (RPN 9)
June 2:  Pinoy Pop Superstar (GMA 7)
June 13: Philippines' Next Top Model (RPN 9)
June 16: Flash Report: Special Edition (GMA 7)
June 17: Magic Kamison (GMA 7)
June 22:
 Magandang Umaga, Pilipinas (ABS-CBN 2)
 Maria Flordeluna (ABS-CBN 2)
 Breakfast (Studio 23)
June 28: Here Comes the Bride (Q 11)
June 29:
 Asian Treasures (GMA 7)
 Homeboy (ABS-CBN 2)
July 6: GTO Live (GMA 7)
July 10: Bahay Mo Ba 'To? (GMA 7)
July 12: Which Star Are You From (ABS-CBN 2)
July 13:
 May Minamahal (ABS-CBN 2)
 Who's Your Daddy Now? (GMA 7)
 MMS: My Music Station (Q 11)
July 14: HP: To the Highest Level Na! (GMA 7)
July 20:
 Pilipinas, Gising Ka Na Ba? (UNTV 37)
 Wazzup Wazzup (Studio 23)
July 22: Digital Tour (Studio 23)
July 26: Rounin (ABS-CBN 2)
July 27:
 Sinasamba Kita (GMA 7)
 Love Truly (GMA 7)
July 28:
 Gokada Go! (ABS-CBN 2)
 Wow Mali Bytes (ABC 5)
July 29:
 Daddy Di Do Du (GMA 7)
 Move: Billy Crawford's Search for the Next Pinoy Dancers (GMA 7)
 Popstar Kids (Q 11)
 Something About 1% (ABS-CBN 2)
August 6: H3O: Ha Ha Ha Over (Q 11)
August 10:
 1062 kHz Balita Update (Net 25)
 Newsbeat (Net 25)
 Dokyu (ABC 5)
 Silence (Q 11)
August 12:
 Mga Kuwento ni Lola Basyang (GMA 7)
 IKON Philippines (RPN 9)
 At Home Ka Dito (ABS-CBN 2)
August 14: Lovers in Prague (GMA 7)
August 17: Lupin (GMA 7)
August 31: Walang Kapalit (ABS-CBN 2)
September 7: 
 Inocente de ti (ABS-CBN 2)
 Pati Ba Pintig ng Puso (GMA 7)
September 8: Ay, Robot! (Q 11)
September 19: Totoo TV (ABC 5)
September 21:
 Margarita (ABS-CBN 2)
 Impostora (GMA 7)
 Love in Heaven (GMA 7)
October 5:
 Mga Mata ni Anghelita (GMA 7)
 Meteor Garden (GMA 7) 
October 12: Natutulog Ba ang Diyos? (ABS-CBN 2)
October 13: U Can Dance (ABS-CBN 2)
October 19:
 Meteor Rain (GMA 7)
 Jumong (GMA 7)
October 20:
 KSP: Kapamilya Sabado Party (ABS-CBN Davao)
 Sabado Barkada (ABS-CBN Bacolod)
October 27:
 Komiks Presents: Pedro Penduko at ang mga Engkantao (ABS-CBN 2)
 John en Shirley (ABS-CBN 2)
November 9:
 Kokey (ABS-CBN 2)
 Kung Mahawi Man ang Ulap (GMA 7)
November 14: Palaban (GMA 7)
November 16: Zorro: The Sword and the Rose (ABS-CBN 2)
December 7: Pangarap na Bituin (ABS-CBN 2)
December 14:
 Couple or Trouble (GMA 7)
 Meteor Garden II (GMA 7)
December 15: Super Inggo 1.5: Ang Bagong Bangis (ABS-CBN 2)
December 21:
 Princess Sarah (ABS-CBN 2)
 A Farewall to Sorrow (Q 11)
December 26: Cerge for Truth (RPN 9)
December 28:
 Kabarkada, Break the Bank (Studio 23)
 Hwang Jini (GMA 7)
 Dee's Day (RPN 9)
 The Police Hour (RPN 9)
December 29: Insight Inside (RPN 9) 
December 30: Family Rosary Crusade (RPN 9)

Unknown dates
January: Milyonaryong Mini (ABS-CBN 2)
June: NBA Jam (RPN 9 and Basketball TV)
July: Stars on Ice (Q 11)
September: iPBA (ABC 5) 
October: At Your Service-Star Power (Q 11)
December: Buhay Pelota (SBN 21)
December: Buhay Pinoy (SBN 21)

Unknown
Nagmamahal, Kapamilya (ABS-CBN 2)
Salam (ABS-CBN 2)
Sirit (ABS-CBN 2)
Yes to Christmas (ABS-CBN 2)
Just Joking (GMA 7)
Coca-Cola's Ride to Fame: Yes to Your Dreams! (GMA 7)
Sports Desk (Solar Sports)
Barangay Uniting For Chess (SBN 21)
Jesus: Lord Of The Nations (SBN 21)
Usapang Legal with Willie (SBN 21)
Kerygma TV (SBN 21)
Oras ng Himala (SBN 21)
Oras ng Katotohanan (SBN 21)
Celebrity Night of Dance and Music (SBN 21)
Philippine Headline News (SBN 21)
Friends Again (SBN 21)
SBN Music Videos (SBN 21)
The Insider (ETC)
Starting Over (ETC)
Krusada Kontra Krimen (NBN 4, RPN 9 and IBC 13)
Ano Ba'ng Hanap Mo (IBC 13)
A Taste of Life with Heny Sison (IBC 13)
AM @ IBC (IBC 13)
Linawin Natin (IBC 13)
Liwanagin Natin (Net 25)
Ating Alamin (ABC 5)
The Basketball Show (RPN 9)

Births
 February 12 – Esang de Torres, singer
 April 19 – Bimby Aquino Yap, actor and TV-media personality (son of James Yap and Kris Aquino)
 August 1 – Marco Masa, child actor
 September 28 – Cessa Moncera, actress
 December 9 – Zyren Dela Cruz, actor

Deaths
 March 16: Joey Gosiengfiao, film director (born 1941)
 April 7: Ogie Juliano, theater director (born 1961)
 May 18: Yoyoy Villame, singer and comedian (born 1938)
 August 9: Pete Roa, television host (born 1940)
 August 27: Ramon Zamora, actor (born 1935)
 November 15: Emoy Gorgonia, former TV host "Tukaan" (born 1962)
 November 16: Ross Rival a.k.a. Rosauro Salvador, action film actor and father of actress Maja Salvador (born 1945)
 December 5: Rene Villanueva, creator and head writer of Batibot (born 1954)
 December 15: Ace Vergel, film actor (born 1952)

Networks

Launches
 February 12: Central Luzon Television
 March 12: DZMM TeleRadyo
 October 1: RHTV
 December 8: TV Maria

Unknown (dates)
 SineBox

References

See also
2007 in television

 
Television in the Philippines by year
Philippine television-related lists